Jaanus Karilaid (born 1 February 1977 in Tallinn) is an Estonian politician. He has been member of XIII and XIV Riigikogu.

In 2007 he graduated from Tallinn University in political science.

Since 1997 he is a member of Estonian Centre Party. Since 1997 he is the Vice-Chairman of this party.

References

1977 births
Estonian Centre Party politicians
Living people
Members of the Riigikogu, 2015–2019
Members of the Riigikogu, 2019–2023
Members of the Riigikogu, 2023–2027
Politicians from Tallinn
Tallinn University alumni